Thomes Creek is a major watercourse on the west side of the Sacramento Valley in Northern California.

There are no permanent dams on the creek, although there are some small diversions for agriculture and domestic water supply, and the overall water quality is considered good. The upper  of Thomes Creek are rated Class IV–V+ ("very difficult") for whitewater kayaking and rafting.

Name origin
Thomes Creek was named after Robert Hasty Thomes, a pioneer who arrived to the area in the 1840s. Thomes' name has been frequently mispronounced and misspelled, resulting in many officially-recorded variant names such as "Thomas Creek", "Thoms Creek" and "Toms Creek".

Geography
Thomes Creek begins at Kingsley Lake, a small pond at elevation  in the Mendocino National Forest. The lake is in a saddle between Solomon Peak,  and Sugarloaf Mountain,  near the Tehama-Trinity County line. It passes through the narrow Thomes Gorge, also known simply as "The Gorge", and emerges from the mountains near Paskenta. From there it flows east-northeast through the semi-arid foothills of the Coast Ranges past Henleyville, Richfield and Tehama to join the Sacramento River at river mile 226 (km 364). 

The upper watershed is rugged, mountainous and highly prone to flooding and landslides. The lower part of the creek flows over a wide cobbled alluvial bed composed of coarse gravel and large boulders. Due to the seasonal nature of precipitation in this area, the lower part of Thomes Creek is often dry during the summer. The watershed receives most of its precipitation in the form of rain, though snow falls frequently at elevations above .

Water quality in Thomes Creek is considered good although it has been impacted by high rates of erosion, caused in part by the unstable sedimentary rock that makes up much of the Coast Ranges, but also from human activities such as ranching, logging, agriculture and mining.

Discharge
A U.S. Geological Survey stream gage at Paskenta measured the discharge of Thomes Creek between October 1920 and September 1996.

Ecology
The creek provides habitat for as many as 22 fish species according to a 1982 study, including Sacramento pikeminnow, Sacramento sucker, hardhead, California roach and speckled dace. The creek is host to significant runs of steelhead trout, as well as resident populations of rainbow trout (landlocked steelhead) above the waterfalls in the Gorge which form partial barriers to fish passage. The creek is also home to spring-run chinook salmon.

See also
List of rivers of California

References

Rivers of Tehama County, California
Tributaries of the Sacramento River